Filopimin Finos (1908 – January 26, 1977) was a Greek film producer of 186 films and the founder of Finos Film, whose first film was in 1939.  He built the first sound recording device in Greece, and shot the first colour film with stereo sound. Finos died in January 1977 after suffering cancer for seven years and he left no heir.

Selected filmography
 The Parting Song (1939)

References
 

1908 births
1977 deaths
Deaths from cancer in Greece
Greek film producers
20th-century Greek businesspeople
People from Phthiotis